Irene Lilienheim Angelico (born December 9, 1946) is a Canadian film director, producer and writer.

Early life
Angelico was born in 1946 in Munich.  Her parents, survivors of the Vilna Ghetto, emigrated to Canada. She received a BA degree from Sir George Williams University, Montreal, in 1974.

Career 
In 1980, Angelico and her partner Abbey Neidik, who would become a frequent collaborator, produced and directed the feature documentary, Dark Lullabies. The film explored the effect of the Holocaust on children of survivors and second-generation Germans.  The film received the first prize for  "The Most Socially/Politically Engaging Film" at Mannheim and the prize for "The Most Memorable Film" in Tokyo. It was included in The Fifty Greatest Documentaries of all Time at the international Salute to the Documentary, and selected to represent the best of the NFB's Studio D at retrospectives in London and France. In the summer of 2013, it was selected as the inaugural feature documentary at the Stratford Festival Forum. The film continues to be screened and broadcast worldwide including special commemorative screening in Berlin and Vilnius.

Angelico went on to write and direct 1998's The Cola Conquest, a documentary about Coca-Cola as a metaphor for America. The documentary Black Coffee explored the history and social impact of coffee.  The 2007 film Inside the Great Magazines was about the first international media.

Angelico also produced and wrote many documentaries including the 1992 Entre Solitudes about the Anglos of Quebec; The Love Prophet and the Children of God about a sex for salvation cult; She Got Game;  Vendetta Song, about an honour killing in Turkey; Canadaville, USA; about the town Franck Stonach built for Katrina Surviivors and Unbreakable Minds, a film that explores mental illness.

Angelico was one of the founding chairs of the Canadian Independent Film Caucus Montreal (CIFC), now known as DOC.

Books 
Angelico co-edited The Aftermath: A Survivor's Odyssey Through War-Torn Europe, written by her father, Henry Lilienheim.

Collections
Her work is included in the collections of the National Film Board of Canada, the Australian Centre for the Moving Image and the Cinémathèque québécoise.

Filmography
...And They Lived Happily Ever After, 1975 (co-directed with Kathleen Shannon and Anne Henderson)
Meditation in Motion (1979)
Dark Lullabies (1985)
Entre Solitudes / Between Solitudes (1992)
The Burning Times (1990)
The Cola Conquest; A Trilogy (1998)
The Love Prophet and the Children of God (1998)
She Got Game, producer (2003)
Vendetta Song (2005)
Unbreakable Minds (2005)
Black Coffee (2007)
Canadaville, USA, producer (2008)
Shekinah: The Intimate Life of Hasidic Women, producer 
Beyond Earth: the Beginning of NewSpace, producer (2013)

References 

1949 births
Living people
Canadian women film producers
Canadian women screenwriters
Artists from Munich
Canadian women film directors
Film directors from Montreal
Film producers from Quebec
Canadian documentary film directors
Canadian documentary film producers
Canadian women documentary filmmakers